Josef Fleischlinger (12 December 1911 – 4 April 2013) was a Czechoslovak basketball coach and referee, an ice hockey referee, and a sports official.

Biography
At first a basketball player in Brno, Fleischlinger later became a coach and led the Sokol Brno I. team to give title victories in the Czechoslovak Basketball League between 1945 and 1951. He was an assistant coach of the Czechoslovak basketball team at the 1946 European Championship in Geneva, where the team won a gold medal. As a coach, he twice led the national team at the Olympics (1948 in London — 7th place; 1952 in Helsinki — 10th place) and twice earned a silver medal at EuroBasket (1947 in Prague, 1955 in Budapest). From 1946, he was a FIBA referee, later a commissioner at FIBA tournaments. He relinquished his coaching career in 1955 in order to devote himself to his duties as the FIBA official. In the Czechoslovak Basketball Federation, Fleischlinger headed the referee section and was a member of the Federation's committee.

As an ice hockey referee, Josef Fleischlinger took part at four games at the 1948 Winter Olympics in St. Moritz. Among others, he worked the Canada - Sweden match (3-1) on January 30, 1948. Fleischlinger was inducted into the City of Brno Sports Hall of Fame in 2011.

Coach 
 1945-1951 Sokol Brno I., 5x League Champion
 1946-1955 Czechoslovakia national basketball team
 Achievements:
 Summer Olympic Games (coach): 1948 London (7th place) and 1952 Helsinky (10th place)
 EuroBasket (assistant coach): 1946 Geneva (European Champion)
 EuroBasket (coach) 2x runner-up: 1947 Prague (2nd place) and 1955 Budapest (2nd place)

International referee 
 1946 FIBA, international basketball referee, FIBA official for international games
 1948 Winter Olympic Games 1948, 4 games of the Olympic ice hockey tournament

Sports official 
 From 1969 committee member of the basketball section of the Czechoslovak Sports Association, head of the referee commission

Published works 
 Josef Fleischlinger, Zdeněk Procházka : Pravidla košíkové, 1. vydání, Praha : Olympia, 1977, 69s

References

External links 
 Basketbalový trenér, hokejový rozhodčí Fleischlinger slaví stovku web brnensky.denik.cz, 11.12.2011
 Dlouhý život přivedl Josefa Fleischlingera k hokeji i basketbalu web ceskatelevize.cz, 12.12.2011
 Trenér Fleischlinger oslavil stovku na setkání s legendami web sport.cz, 16.12.2011
 Zemřel legendární 101letý basketbalista Josef Fleischlinger web pravednes.cz, 04.04.2013
 Zemřela legenda československého basketbalu Josef Fleischlinger web cbf.cz, 05.04.2013
 Trenér, který víc ukazoval, než mluvil web basket.idnes.cz, 10.04.2013
In English
 IV EUROPEAN CHAMPIONSHIP GENEVE 1946) web linguasport.com
 V EUROPEAN CHAMPIONSHIP (PRAHA 1947) web linguasport.com
 1947 — NATIONAL SQUADS web linguasport.com
 II Olympic Basketball Tournament (London 1948) web linguasport.com
 1948 — NATIONAL SQUADS web linguasport.com
 III Olympic Basketball Tournament (Helsinki 1952) web linguasport.com
 1952 — NATIONAL SQUADS web linguasport.com
 IX EUROPEAN CHAMPIONSHIP (BUDAPEST 1955) web linguasport.com
 1955 — NATIONAL SQUADS web linguasport.com

1911 births
2013 deaths
Czechoslovak basketball coaches
Czech basketball coaches
Czechoslovak men's basketball players
Czech men's basketball players
Czech sports executives and administrators
Czech centenarians
Sportspeople from Brno
Men centenarians